Maria de Lourdes Abadia  (born August 14, 1944) is a Brazilian politician. She was the Governor of Federal District of Brazil in 2006.

References

Living people
1944 births
21st-century Brazilian women politicians